MSDR may refer to:

Manchester South District Railway, a former railway line in Manchester, UK
Mississippi Delta Railroad, a railroad company in Mississippi, United States